Jan Wallman (May 14, 1922 – October 8, 2015) was an American night club owner and producer.

Life
She was born in Roundup, Montana.
She studied at University of Minnesota.
She managed the night club Upstairs-at-the-Duplex. Many performers had their start there, including Barbra Streisand, Joan Rivers, and Woody Allen.

In 1986, a celebration was held in her honor at Carnegie Hall.

References

External links

1922 births
2015 deaths
People from Roundup, Montana
Businesspeople from New York City
University of Minnesota alumni
20th-century American businesspeople